{{DISPLAYTITLE:C19H20N2O3S}}
The molecular formula C19H20N2O3S (molar mass: 356.41 g/mol, exact mass: 356.1195 u) may refer to:

 Apricoxib
 Pioglitazone (Actos)

Molecular formulas